Georges Augustin Albert Charpy (1 September 1865 – 25 November 1945) was the French scientist who created the Charpy impact test. He attended École Polytechnique from 1885 to 1887 and graduated with a degree in Marine Artillery. In 1887 he became a professor at École Monge. In 1892 he published his physics thesis. In 1920 he became a professor of metallurgy at École Nationale Supérieure des Mines de Paris. In 1922 he became the professor of general chemistry at École Polytechnique.

References 
 

1865 births
1945 deaths
People from Oullins
French metallurgists
Members of the French Academy of Sciences
École Polytechnique alumni
Mines Paris - PSL alumni